The Belgrade anti-gay riot was an incident of violence against LGBT people that occurred on 10 October 2010 during a pride parade, organized to promote LGBT rights in Serbia. The gay pride parade has been the first in Belgrade since 2001; a planned parade in 2009 was cancelled due to the threat of violence.

Anti-gay and anti-government protesters fought with about 5,000 armed police, throwing Molotov cocktails, bricks, stones, glass bottles and firecrackers; the police used  tear gas and rubber bullets. There were no fatalities.

Results

Police said that 78 police officers and 17 civilians had been injured, and 101 people had been detained for violent behaviour. The garage of the building of the ruling pro-European Democratic Party was set ablaze, and state TV building and the headquarters  of other political parties were also damaged. The parade was viewed as a test for the government of Serbia, which has stated it will protect human rights in Serbia as it seeks to become an EU member. Jelko Kacin, presiding over the European Union's evaluation of Serbia, said that Serbia's failure to stop the riot could damage its bid to join the EU. During a visit to Belgrade two days after the riot, US secretary of state, Hillary Clinton, praised the Serbian government for protecting the human rights of the parade participants.

See also

LGBT rights in Serbia
2010 in LGBT rights

References

LGBT in Serbia
LGBT-related riots
Violence against LGBT people in Europe
Far-right politics in Serbia
Persecution of LGBT people
Riots and civil disorder in Serbia
Events in Belgrade
Human rights abuses in Serbia
2010 in Serbia
2010 riots
2010 in LGBT history
2010s in Belgrade
October 2010 events in Europe